The 1982 United States Senate elections were held on November 2, 1982. They were elections for the United States Senate following Republican gains in 1980. The 33 Senate seats of Class 1 were up for election in 1982. A total of four seats changed hands between parties, with Democrats winning seats in New Jersey and New Mexico, and Republicans taking seats in Nevada and the seat of the lone independent, Senator Harry Byrd Jr., in Virginia. Democrats made a net gain of one seat in the elections, while Republicans stayed at 54 seats for a majority. A special election was also held in Washington state in 1983 that gave Republicans a seat that was previously held by a Democrat, bringing their majority to 55-45.

Results summary

Source: Office of the Clerk

Gains, losses, and holds

Retirements
Two Republicans and one independent retired instead of seeking re-election.

Defeats
One Republican and one Democrat sought re-election but lost in the general election.

Change in composition

Before the elections

After the elections

Race summaries

Special elections 
There were no special elections during 1982.

Elections leading to the next Congress 
In these general elections, the winners were elected for the term beginning January 3, 1983; ordered by state.

All of the elections involved the Class 1 seats.

Closest races 

In eleven races the margin of victory was under 10%.

Arizona 

Incumbent Democrat Dennis DeConcini won re-election to a second term over Republican Pete Dunn, State Representative.

California 

Incumbent Republican S. I. Hayakawa decided to retire after one term. Republican Pete Wilson, Mayor of San Diego and former Assemblyman, won the open seat over Democratic Governor Jerry Brown.

Wilson was known as a fiscal conservative who supported Proposition 13, although Wilson had opposed the measure while mayor of San Diego. However, Brown ran on his gubernatorial record of building the largest state budget surpluses in California history. Both Wilson and Brown were moderate-to-liberal on social issues, including support for abortion rights. The election was expected to be close, with Brown holding a slim lead in most of the polls leading up to Election Day. Wilson hammered away at Brown's appointment of California Chief Justice Rose Bird, using this to portray himself as tougher on crime than Brown was. Brown's late entry into the 1980 Democratic presidential primary, after promising not to run, was also an issue. President Ronald Reagan made a number of visits to California late in the race to campaign for Wilson. Reagan quipped that the last thing he wanted to see was one of his home state's U.S. Senate seats falling into Democrats' hands, especially to be occupied by the man who succeeded him as governor. Despite exit polls indicating a narrow Brown victory, Wilson won by a wide margin.

Connecticut 

Incumbent Republican Lowell P. Weicker Jr. won re-election to a third term over Democratic member of the House Toby Moffett.

Delaware 

Incumbent Republican Bill V. Roth won reelection to a third term over the state's Democratic Insurance Commissioner David N. Levinson.

Florida 

Incumbent Democrat Lawton Chiles won re-election to a third term over Republican state senator Van B. Poole.

Hawaii 

Incumbent Democrat Spark Matsunaga won re-election to a second term over Republican Clarence Brown, a retired Foreign Service officer

Indiana 

Incumbent Republican Richard Lugar faced Democratic United States Representative Floyd Fithian in the general election. Lugar won with a margin of 54% of the vote, compared to Fithian's 46%.

After the 1980 census, the Indiana General Assembly redistricted Indiana's congressional districts, pushing Democratic representative Floyd Fithian's district into more conservative territory. After redistricting, Fithian, the three term incumbent of Indiana's 2nd congressional district, decided to run for Secretary of State of Indiana, but withdrew from the primary to ultimately run for the United States Senate. He challenged fellow Democrat and one term Indiana State Senator Michael Kendall of Jasper, Indiana, who Fithian earlier encouraged to run for the Senate. Kendall, who represented Indiana's 47th Senate district and formed the Notre Dame Students for Robert Kennedy organization during the 1968 presidential election, was seen a young progressive alternative to Fithian, who he called the "ideological twin of Richard Lugar." After the bitterly contested primary, Fithian prevailed over Kendall, winning with 59% of the vote.

Incumbent United States Senator Richard Lugar won the republican nomination in an uncontested primary on May 4, 1982.

In the general election, Lugar faced Fithian and American Party candidate Raymond James.

On November 5, 1982, Lugar defeated Fithian and James in the general election, winning 74 of Indiana's 93 counties.

Maine 

Incumbent Democrat George J. Mitchell, originally appointed to the seat after Edmund Muskie resigned, won re-election to his full six-year term over Republican U.S. Representative David F. Emery, earning 61% of the vote to Emery's 39%. Mitchell would serve two more terms in the Senate, eventually serving as Senate Majority Leader.

Maryland 

Incumbent Democrat Paul Sarbanes won re-election to a second term in office. He defeated the Republican former Representative from Maryland's 5th district and Prince George's County Executive Lawrence Hogan.

Massachusetts 

Incumbent Democrat Ted Kennedy won re-election to his fifth (his fourth full) term over Republican Ray Shamie, a millionaire businessman and metalwork entrepreneur.

Michigan 

Incumbent Democrat Don Riegle won re-election to a second term, defeating Republican challenger Philip Ruppe, a former U.S. Representative from Houghton.

Minnesota 

Incumbent Republican David Durenberger won re-election to his first full term over Democratic businessman Mark Dayton.

Dayton, 35, self-financed his campaign. Married to a Rockefeller and heir to a department store, his net worth was an estimated $30 million. Durenberger, who in 1978 and won the special election to finish the term of the late Hubert Humphrey, was largely unknown. He was considered a moderate, but supported Reagan's tax cuts. Dayton ran against Reaganomics. He has also campaigned against tax breaks for the wealthy and even promised "to close tax loopholes for the rich and the corporations—and if you think that includes the Daytons, you're right." By the end of September, the senate election already became the most expensive election of all-time, with over $8 million being spent. Dayton spent over $5 million, while Durenberger spent over $2 million.

Mississippi 

Incumbent Democrat John C. Stennis won re-election to his seventh term over Republican Haley Barbour, a political operative who campaigned for U.S. Presidents Richard Nixon and Gerald Ford.

Missouri 

Incumbent John Danforth, originally elected in the 1976 United States Senate election in Missouri, ran for a second term. In the general election, he narrowly defeated state senator Harriett Woods by just over a percentage point. Danforth would go on to serve two more terms in the Senate.

Montana 

Incumbent John Melcher, who was first elected to the Senate in 1976, opted to run for re-election. He won the Democratic primary after he faced a tough intraparty challenger, and advanced to the general election, where he faced Larry R. Williams, an author and the Republican nominee, and Larry Dodge, the Libertarian nominee. Though his margin was reduced significantly from his initial election, Melcher still comfortably won re-election to his second and final term in the Senate.

During his first term in the Senate, Melcher's relative conservatism for a Democrat prompted a primary challenger in Michael Bond, a housing contractor who campaigned on his opposition to nuclear war. Bond attacked Melcher for voting to increase spending on nuclear arms, and pledged to reduce military spending to $60 billion and to use the savings to reduce interest rates. During the campaign, Bond came under fire from the state branches of the Veterans of Foreign Wars and the Disabled American Veterans for turning in his draft card in 1967 to protest the Vietnam War, who put out a statement, saying, "There is no place in the U.S. Senate for any draft dodger, draft card burner or draft protester of any kind."

Nebraska 

Incumbent Democrat Edward Zorinsky won re-election.

Nevada 

Incumbent Democrat Howard Cannon ran for re-election to a fifth term, but lost to Republican State Senator Chic Hecht.

New Jersey 

Democrat Frank Lautenberg won for the seat held by retiring incumbent Republican Senator Nicholas Brady. Lautenberg won the seat with a margin of 3.2% over member of the House Millicent Fenwick.

Cresitello dropped out of the race on May 27 but remained on the June 8 primary ballot.

The seat had been occupied by Democrat Harrison A. Williams, who resigned on March 11, 1982, after being implicated in the Abscam scandal. After Williams' resignation, Republican Governor Thomas Kean appointed Republican Nicholas F. Brady to the seat. Brady served in the Senate through the primary and general elections but did not run for the seat himself.

In the general election, Lautenberg faced popular Republican member of the House Millicent Fenwick. She ran on a very progressive platform and polls in the Summer of 1982 put her ahead by 18 points. Even Lautenberg quipped that she was "the most popular candidate in the country." Lautenberg spent more of his own money, eventually out-spending Fenwick two-to-one. He emphasised President Reagan's unpopularity, reminded the voters that she would be a vote for a Republican majority in the Senate and called Fenwick, who was 72, "eccentric" and "erratic" but denied that he was referring to her age. He did however point out that she would be almost 80 at the end of her first term and was therefore unlikely to gain much seniority in the Senate. Coincidentally, the age issue would be used against Lautenberg in his own re-election bid in 2008.

Lautenberg won by 51% to 48%, in what was considered a major upset. Brady, who had just a few days left in his appointed term, resigned on December 27, 1982, allowing Lautenberg to take office several days before the traditional swearing-in of senators, which gave him an edge in seniority over the other freshman senators.

New Mexico 

Incumbent Republican Harrison Schmitt was running for re-election to a second term, but lost to Democrat Jeff Bingaman, Attorney General of New Mexico.

New York 

Incumbent Democrat Daniel Patrick Moynihan won re-election to a second term over Republican Assemblywoman Florence Sullivan.

North Dakota 

The incumbent, North Dakota Democratic NPL Party (Dem-NPL) Quentin Burdick, sought and received re-election to his fifth term, defeating Republican candidate Gene Knorr.

Only Burdick filed as a Dem-NPLer, and the endorsed Republican candidate was cattle rancher Gene Knorr. Burdick and Knorr won the primary elections for their respective parties. Burdick's campaign was known for employing more television advertisement spending when compared with his campaigns in the past, as well as making several negative portrayals. Knorr had the support of Vice President George H. W. Bush, who campaigned in state to support his candidacy. The election was also noted as the first where Burdick's age began to become an issue. Burdick, who was 74 during the year of the election, faced a much younger Knorr, who was 41. At one point, Burdick challenged Knorr to a fistfight to prove his vitality; but the challenge, assumed to be a joke, never occurred. After being defeated, Knorr moved to Washington, D.C., where he took the position of staff vice president with Philip Morris International.

One independent candidate, Anna B. Bourgois, also filed before the deadline, running under her self-created party titled God, Family, and Country. Bourgois would later run for North Dakota's other United States Senate seat as an independent in 1986, challenging Mark Andrews. She received over 8,000 votes in the election, which is rather high for an independent. Some attribute her large number of votes to the name of her party – which was based on things that North Dakotans valued.  Despite the result, Bourgois' campaign still had little impact on the outcome.

Prior to the 1982 Senate campaign, Knorr had been working in Washington, DC since 1970 when he worked for the Department of Treasury.  He began working in Washington, DC, residing in McLean, Virginia after receiving a Juris Doctorate from Northwestern University where he was celebrated in debate.  From Treasury, he worked as a lobbyist with Charls E. Walker Associates.

Ohio 

Incumbent Democrat Howard Metzenbaum successfully sought re-election to his third term, defeating Republican State Senator from Bucyrus Paul Pfeifer.

Pennsylvania 

Incumbent Republican H. John Heinz III successfully sought re-election to another term, defeating Democratic nominee Cyril Wecht, member of the Allegheny County Board of Commissioners.

John Heinz's Democratic opponent in the 1982 election was Allegheny County commissioner and former coroner Cyril Wecht, who lacked significant name recognition outside of Pittsburgh, his home town. Although the 1982 elections were a setback nationally for incumbent President Ronald Reagan and the Republican Party, neither Heinz nor incumbent Republican governor Dick Thornburgh, who was also up for re-election in 1982, were challenged by Democrats with statewide prominence. Wecht ran a low-budget campaign lacking the assets to boost his name recognition; The Philadelphia Inquirer ran a headline dubbing the race "The Race for Senator No One Seemed to Notice." Despite this, Heinz ran a cautious campaign, running as a moderate due to Pennsylvania's unemployment, 11%, one of the highest in the nation at the time, as well as the declining health of Pennsylvania's coal mining, manufacturing and steel industries. In the end, Heinz won the election by a wide margin, winning 59.3% of the popular vote. Wecht won 39.2% of the popular vote.

Rhode Island 

Incumbent Republican John Chafee successfully sought re-election to a second term, defeating Democrat Julius C. Michaelson, former Attorney General of Rhode Island.

Tennessee 

Democrat Jim Sasser was re-elected with 61.9% of the vote, over Republican Robin Beard, a member of the U.S. House of Representatives.

Texas 

Incumbent Democrat Lloyd Bentsen successfully ran for re-election to his third term, defeating Republican U.S. Representative James M. Collins.

Democrat incumbent, Lloyd Bentsen, won re-election.

Utah 

Incumbent Republican Orrin Hatch successfully ran for re-election to his second term, defeating Democrat Mayor of Salt Lake City Ted Wilson.

Vermont 

Incumbent Republican Robert Stafford successfully ran for re-election to another term in the United States Senate, defeating Democratic candidate James A. Guest.

Virginia 

U.S. Representative from Virginia's 1st district, Paul Trible replaced Independent Senator Harry F. Byrd Jr., who was stepping down after three terms.  He beat Democratic Lieutenant Governor of Virginia, Richard Joseph Davis.

Washington 

Incumbent Democrat Henry M. Jackson successfully ran for re-election to his sixth and final term, defeating Republican challenger Doug Jewett, a Seattle City Attorney and independent King Lysen, a state senator.

West Virginia 

Incumbent Democrat Robert Byrd won re-election to a fifth term over Republican Cleve Benedict, a freshman member of the House.

Benedict made great note of Byrd's record of high office in the Ku Klux Klan, his avoidance of service in World War II, and the fact that Byrd, then alone among members of Congress, owned no home in the state he represented. His campaign represented the last serious and well-funded effort to unseat Byrd, spending $1,098,218. Byrd was Minority Leader at the time.

Wisconsin 

Incumbent Democrat William Proxmire successfully ran for re-election to his fifth and final term, defeating Republican States Representative Scott McCallum.

Wyoming 

Incumbent Republican U.S. Senator Malcolm Wallop was re-elected to a second term in office, defeating Democratic State Senator Rodger McDaniel.

See also
 1982 United States elections
 1982 United States gubernatorial elections
 1982 United States House of Representatives elections
 97th United States Congress
 98th United States Congress

Notes

References